Marcus "Bellringer" Bell also known as Marcus Bell or simply "BellRinger" is an American music producer, composer, and musician. He has worked with national and international recording artists, including American artists Katy Perry and Lady Gaga, Italian pop star Gala, British singer Fleur East, and Malaysian-Australian singer-songwriter Che'Nelle. Bell wrote and produced 3 songs on Che'Nelle's 2007 debut album Things Happen for a Reason.

Biography 
Bell was born in Norfolk, Virginia. His mother was Carolyn Williams Bell (1944–2018), a pioneer in the American Tennis Association in 1961. The two co-authored the book Bellringer Branding Bible: The 5 Musician Branding Principles for Singers, Rappers, DJs, Music Producers, Composers, Writers, and Recording Artists.

Bell attended Berklee College of Music where he graduated in 1996. By 2001, he was the music producer of his own duo The Sun Kings and their track "Maskerade" (Subliminal singer) featuring vocalist Diva Dash was mentioned as a "hot rising dance track" in Billboard Magazine on June 9 of that year.

Bell has produced soundtracks, he has acted and composed for television and film, and several of his song were placed in major U.S. televised dramas since 2017. Two songs, "All That I Need (feat. SWEEDiSH)" and "This Is My Reality" (feat. Sweet Paul & Mr.W1N), were placed in Season 4, Episode 7 (You Lied to My Face) of Power, airing on 6 August 2017, and he had two other songs placed on Empire: "Get On the Floor (ft. Cdubb)" in Season 4, Episode 9 (That Ain't Me) airing on 20 August 2017 and "Keep Steppin" (feat. Sophia Nicole) in Season 1, Episode 6 (Out, Damned Spot) on 11 February 2015.

Discography 
The website Allmusic.com lists over 20 songs to his credits from 1981 to 2017 working with renowned artists such as Katy Perry, Nicki Minaj, and RZA, as well as lesser-known artists overseas and in the U.S. including producing and co-producing music with data scientist and composer Shelita Burke.

Credits

References

External links
 

Living people
Year of birth missing (living people)
Berklee College of Music alumni
Songwriters from Virginia
Musicians from Norfolk, Virginia
Record producers from Virginia
African-American record producers
21st-century African-American people